Dansere (Norwegian for "dancers") is an album by Jan Garbarek. The album was recorded at Talent Studios in Oslo in November 1975, and features the Bobo Stenson Quartet.

Track listing 
"Dansere" – 15:08
"Svevende" – 5:03
"Bris" – 6:18
"Skrik & Hyl" – 1:35
"Lokk" – 5:44
"Til Vennene" – 4:47

Personnel 

Jan Garbarek – saxophones
Bobo Stenson – piano
Palle Danielsson – bass
Jon Christensen – drums

References

1976 albums
Jan Garbarek albums
Albums produced by Manfred Eicher